Tachina magnicornis is a species of fly in the genus Tachina of the family Tachinidae that can be found everywhere in Europe, except for Belarus, Ireland, Liechtenstein, Luxembourg, Monaco, San Marino, Vatican City, and various European islands.

References 

Insects described in 1844
Diptera of Europe
magnicornis